Yakaré-Oulé (Nani) Jansen Reventlow is a human rights lawyer who specialises in freedom of expression and strategic litigation. She is the founding director of Digital Freedom Fund, which advances digital rights in Europe through strategic litigation. She is a Lecturer in Law at Columbia Law School, adjunct faculty at the Blavatnik School of Government at the University of Oxford, and an "Associate Tenant" at Doughty Street Chambers. She is the recipient of various awards and honours, including Harvard Law School's "Women Inspiring Change" in 2020, and Oxford Internet Institute's Internet and Society award in 2018.

Career 
Throughout her career, Jansen Reventlow has been responsible for several notable freedom of expression cases across national and international jurisdictions, including the first freedom of expression judgment from the African Court on Human and Peoples’ Rights and from the East African Court of Justice. From 2011 to 2016, she oversaw litigation practice at Media Legal Defence Initiative (MLDI), leading or advising in cases involving over 50 national jurisdictions and international forums such as the European Court of Human Rights, the Inter-American Court of Human Rights, the UN Human Rights Committee, and the UN Working Group on Arbitrary Detention.

Awards and honours 
Jansen Reventlow has received multiple awards and honours, including:
 Harvard Law School’s “Women Inspiring Change” honouree (2020)
 Oxford Internet Institute Internet & Society Award (2018)
 Law Society’s Excellence Award for Human Rights Lawyer of the Year (shortlist 2015)
 Columbia University Global Freedom of Expression Prize for Excellence in Legal Services (2015)

Nomination for UN Special Rapporteur on Freedom of Expression 
In June 2020 it was announced that Nani Jansen Reventlow is one of the four candidates for the position of UN Special Rapporteur on the Promotion and Protection of the Right to Freedom of Opinion and Expression. Other candidates are Irene Khan, Fatou Jagne Senghore and Agustina del Campo.

References

External links 
 Digital Freedom Fund
 Personal website

Human rights lawyers
Digital rights
Year of birth missing (living people)
Living people